Andrei Vasilyevich Martynov (born 17 September 1965) is a former Turkmenistani professional footballer.

Club career
He made his professional debut in the Soviet Second League in 1988 for Köpetdag Aşgabat. He played 1 game in the UEFA Cup 1992–93 for FC Torpedo Moscow.

Honours
 Turkmenistan Higher League champion: 1993.

References

1965 births
Living people
Russian footballers
Soviet footballers
Turkmenistan footballers
Turkmenistan international footballers
Russian Premier League players
FC Torpedo Moscow players
FC Torpedo-2 players
FC Shinnik Yaroslavl players
FC Sibir Novosibirsk players
Association football defenders
FC Znamya Truda Orekhovo-Zuyevo players
FK Köpetdag Aşgabat players